In analytical mechanics, a branch of applied mathematics and physics, a virtual displacement (or infinitesimal variation)  shows how the mechanical system's trajectory can hypothetically (hence the term virtual) deviate very slightly from the actual trajectory  of the system without violating the system's constraints. For every time instant   is a vector tangential to the configuration space at the point  The vectors  show the directions in which  can "go" without breaking the constraints.

For example, the virtual displacements of the system consisting of a single particle on a two-dimensional surface fill up the entire tangent plane, assuming there are no additional constraints.

If, however, the constraints require that all the trajectories  pass through the given point  at the given time  i.e.  then

Notations

The constraints   are here for illustration only.  In practice, for each individual system, an individual set of constraints is required.

Definition

In terms of the tangent map,

Here  is the tangent map of  where  and

Properties
 Coordinate representation.

 If, for some time instant  and every   then, for every  

 If  then

Examples

Free particle in R3
A single particle freely moving in  has 3 degrees of freedom.
By the definition,

which leads to

Free particles on a surface
 particles moving freely on a two-dimensional surface  have  degree of freedom. The configuration space here is 

where  is the radius vector of the  particle.  It follows that

and every path  may be described using the radius vectors  of each individual particle, i.e.

This implies that, for every 

where  Some authors express this as

Rigid body rotating around fixed point
A rigid body rotating around a fixed point with no additional constraints has 3 degrees of freedom. The configuration space here is  the special orthogonal group of dimension 3 (otherwise known as 3D rotation group), and   We use the standard notation  to refer to the three-dimensional linear space of all skew-symmetric three-dimensional matrices. The exponential map  guarantees the existence of  such that, for every path  its variation  and  there is a unique path  such that  and, for every   By the definition,

See also
D'Alembert principle
Virtual work

References

Dynamical systems
Mechanics
Classical mechanics
Lagrangian mechanics